Autumn is a 1990 Estonian comedy film directed by Arvo Kruusement and based on the novels Sügis and Äripäev by Oskar Luts. The film is a sequence of Summer.

Plot

Cast
 Margus Lepa as Kiir
 Liina Tennosaar as Juuli
 Anne Reemann as Maali
 Kaljo Kiisk as Kristjan Lible
 Ita Ever as Mamma Kiir aka Katarina Rosalie
 Tõnu Oja as Bruno Benno Bernhard
 Aare Laanemets as Joosep Toots
 Riina Hein as Teele 
 Väino Laes as Oskar Luts
 Rein Aedma as Jaan Imelik
 Ain Lutsepp as Tõnisson
 Tiit Lilleorg as Kippel
 Aarne Üksküla as Paavel
 Tõnu Kark as Aaberkukk
 Maria Klenskaja as Mrs. Paavel

References

External links
 
 Autumn (1990 film), entry in Estonian Film Database (EFIS)

1990 films
Estonian comedy films
Estonian-language films
Films based on Estonian novels